Melba Till Allen (March 3, 1933 – October 20, 1989) was an American politician who served as the Auditor of Alabama from 1967 to 1975 and as the Treasurer of Alabama from 1975 to 1978.

Allen was convicted in 1978 of using her office to obtain favorable bank loans for several personal businesses including a religious theme park. She failed to disclose these business ventures and a full disclosure of her personal finances.  She was sentenced to six years in jail and three and a half years of probation.

She died of cancer on October 20, 1989, in Montgomery, Alabama at age 56.

References

1933 births
1989 deaths
Deaths from cancer in Alabama
State Auditors of Alabama
State treasurers of Alabama
Alabama Democrats
Women state constitutional officers of Alabama
People from Butler County, Alabama
20th-century American women
Alabama politicians convicted of crimes